Nogales International Airport  is an international airport located at Nogales, Sonora, Mexico, near the U.S.-Mexico border. It handles national and international air traffic for the city of Nogales. It is operated by Aeropuertos y Servicios Auxiliares, a federal government-owned corporation.

In 2021, the airport handled 4,020 passengers, and in 2022 it handled 2,136 passengers.

Statistics

Passengers

See also 

List of the busiest airports in Mexico

References

External links
Nogales International Airport

Airports in Sonora
Nogales, Sonora